Greatest Hits Vol. 2 is a compilation album by Swedish pop group ABBA, released on 29 October 1979 to coincide with their tour of North America and Europe (taking place between September and November 1979). It was ABBA's second chart-topping album of the year, the first being Voulez-Vous, and contained the brand new single "Gimme! Gimme! Gimme! (A Man After Midnight)", recorded in August 1979.

History
A round-up of ABBA's hits since their first compilation album (released in 1975), the album exclusively included material recorded between the years 1976 and 1979 (albums Arrival, The Album and Voulez-Vous plus non-album single "Summer Night City") - with one exception, "Rock Me" from 1975 album ABBA, issued as a single and became a top 5 hit in Australia and New Zealand after the release of the band's first hits package Greatest Hits and also part of the setlist on the 1979 world tour.

"Angeleyes" was included primarily due to its success as a single in the UK, where it was the lead track of a double A-side with "Voulez-Vous". Elsewhere, "Voulez-Vous" had been the A-side in its own right but it was not included on the album.  However, the track "I Wonder (Departure)" was not believed to have been released as a single anywhere, but was featured.

Greatest Hits Vol. 2 was released on CD in 1982 by Polydor but was deleted from their ABBA CD range in 1992 when it was replaced with ABBA Gold. It was also released in the US by Atlantic Records in 1983 with the same mastering as the Polydor CD but was discontinued there in the late 1980s as well.

Commercial reception

Greatest Hits Vol. 2 received massive commercial success in Japan, selling in excess of 920,000 units on the chart (it was the best-selling album by non-domestic artists at the time, until Michael Jackson's Thriller  each sold over 1 million copies in the 1980s).  It is certified Gold in the U.S.

Track listing
All songs written by Benny Andersson & Björn Ulvaeus, except where noted.

Personnel

Agnetha Fältskog - lead vocals , co-lead vocals , backing vocals
Anni-Frid Lyngstad - lead vocals , co-lead vocals , backing vocals
Björn Ulvaeus - lead vocals , acoustic guitar, electric guitar, backing vocals
Benny Andersson - keyboards, synthesizer, backing vocals
Rolf Alex - drums
Ola Brunkert - drums
Lars Carlsson - horn
Christer Danielson - horn
Andrew Eijas - horn
Malando Gassama - percussion
Rutger Gunnarsson - bass
Gloria Lundell - harp
Roger Palm - drums
Halldor Palsson - saxophone
Janne Schaffer - guitar
Bengt Sundberg - horn
Åke Sundqvist - percussion
Mike Watson - bass
Lasse Wellander - guitar
Gunnar Wenneborg - horn
Kajtek Wojciechowski - saxophone

Production
Producers: Benny Andersson & Björn Ulvaeus
Arrangers: Benny Andersson & Björn Ulvaeus
Engineer: Michael B. Tretow

Charts

Weekly charts

Year-end charts

Certifications and sales

References

1979 greatest hits albums
ABBA compilation albums
Polar Music compilation albums
Albums produced by Björn Ulvaeus
Albums produced by Benny Andersson
Atlantic Records compilation albums
Epic Records compilation albums
Albums recorded at Polar Studios